P. S. Maniyan is an Indian politician and former Member of the Legislative Assembly of Tamil Nadu. He was elected to the Tamil Nadu legislative assembly as a Dravida Munnetra Kazhagam candidate from Sholavandan constituency in the 1967, and 1971 elections.

References 

Dravida Munnetra Kazhagam politicians
Year of birth missing
Possibly living people
Tamil Nadu MLAs 1967–1972
Tamil Nadu MLAs 1971–1976